Professor Chen Kegui (Chinese: 辛克贵; Pinyin: Xīn Kègùi) (October 6, 1950 – August 30, 2012) was the head of Department of Civil Engineering at Tsinghua University and Deputy Dean of School of Civil Engineering at Tsinghua University from 2005 until his death in 2012.

Xin was born October 6, 1950 in Sichuan Province, China. He began his college life when he was 23, but he made progress fast. He received his B.Sc. in 1977, M.Sc. in 1983 from Tsinghua University, supervised by professor Yu-qiu Long (a member of the Chinese Academy of Engineering). He later earned a Ph.D. from The Hong Kong Polytechnic University.

Xin served as deputy dean in School of Civil Engineering until his death.  He was author and co-author of numerous scientific publications, an editor, and was on the editorial board of the Journal of  Engineering Mechanics.  He served on the editorial board of the Journal of  Engineering Mechanics from 1997 and contributed to numerous professional activities in structural engineering.

Education Background
 1973-1977 Dept. of Construction and Civil Engineering, Tsinghua University, B.Sc.
 1979-1983 Dept. of Civil Engineering, Tsinghua University, M.Sc. (Advisor:Prof. Yuqiu Long)
 1990-1994 Dept. of Structure and Civil Engineering, The Hong Kong Polytechnic University, Ph.D

Honors
 Liangshi Yiyou Graduate Mentor Awards, 2008
 Excellent Individual Faculty Awards, Tsinghua, 2003
 National Education First Awards. Chinese Gov't, 2002
 Outstanding Journal Paper Awards, 1986

Research Experiences
 1986.06–1990.06 Dept. of Civil Engineering, Tsinghua University, Lecturer
 1990.06–1994.12 Dept. of Structure and Civil Engineering, The Hong Kong Polytechnic University, Lecturer, Associate Researcher
 1995.08–2001.08 Dept. of Civil Engineering, Tsinghua University, Associate Professor
 2001.08–current Dept. of Civil Engineering, Tsinghua University, Professor, Doctoral Tutor
 1992.04–2000.02 Head, Dept. of Civil Engineering, Tsinghua University
 2000.01–2003.06 Director, Office of Construction of Heat & Electricity, Tsinghua University
 2001.11–2002.01 Associate Dean, School of Civil Engineering, Tsinghua University
 2003.06–current Chair, Deputy Dean, School of Civil Engineering, Tsinghua University

Publications
Monographs / Textbooks: 
 Structural Mechanics, 4th Edition, 2001
 Matrix Analysis and Programming, 1989

Research Articles:

Yuqiu Long, Kegui Xin. Generalized conforming element for bending and buckling analysis of plates. Finite Elements in Analysis and Design, 1989, 5(1): 15-30. 
Minghua He, Kegui Xin. Separation work analysis of cohesive law and consistently coupled cohesive law, Applied Mathematics and Mechanics, 2011, 32(11): 1437-1446. 
Kegui Xin, Shihua Bao, W.Y. Li. A Semi-discrete method for analysis of tube-in-tube structures, Computers & Structures, 1994, 53(2): 319-325. 
W.Y. Li, Kegui Xin. Analysis of thin-walled members by complementary energy method using spline function, Thin-walled Structures, 1992, 14(4): 327-342.

References
 Tsinghua University
 Ke-gui Xin
 Xin Kegui's obituary 

1950 births
2012 deaths
Educators from Sichuan
Chinese civil engineers
Academic staff of Tsinghua University
Chinese technology writers
Writers from Chengdu
Engineers from Sichuan